Russkiy Razmer (lit. Russian Size) is a Russian electronic dance band from Saint Petersburg.

Origins 
Russkiy Razmer was formed between 1991 and 1993 by Dmitry Kopotilov and Viktor Bondaryuk, two school friends originally from Kustanay, Kazakh SSR who moved to Saint Petersburg during the late 1980s independently of each other. Kopotilov was a small-business owner and Bondaryuk sold souvenirs. By that time both had played in different music bands. When Kopotilov met Bondaryuk in 1990, he suggested two songs for a new project. They started performing in rave clubs, and in 1992 they recorded several songs that later became part of their debut album: The Star Is Melting Above the Town, I'm Calling You Joy, Batman (Yu-A-Yu). Their first big concert took place in the Yubileyny Sports Palace in 1993 with various pop musicians taking part in it.

The first replicated album of Russkiy Razmer was recorded together with Vadim Volodin, a famous Russian sound-arranger and producer, in Moscow. Russkiy Razmer was an active participant in many TV music shows. The video for the song "Batman" (from the album Yu-A-Yu) reached respectable places on the top charts
.  During that time they actively performed as an opening band at the concerts of Army of Lovers, Haddaway, La Toya Jackson and other touring musicians. Their call "Davai-davai!" (simple translation of "C'mon-c'mon!") quickly became trendy in the Russian club culture.

In 1995 they met Alexander Levin, a TV and music producer. As the leading vocalist Angela (Anzhelika Kuznetsova) left the group to start a solo music career, Levin teamed Kopotilov and Bondaryuk with Alexey Lebedinsky, a parody singer and their old-time friend known by the stage name of Professor Lebedinsky. They regularly performed together from 1996 to 1998 and recorded two albums: Davay-Davay! in 1996 and Hello-Goodbye! in 1997. Their friend Dmitry Nagiyev, at the time a popular radio DJ and showman, also helped them with promotion.

The album We dance? was released in 1998 and reached U.S.A. and Europe. From then on Russkiy Razmer actively went on foreign tours, and during the period of 1997-2005 the group performed in the U.S.A. fifteen times. The song "Angel of the Day" (from the album 650) and the video of the song also reached the charts. Since 1999 Eleonora Filimonova has been the vocalist of the group. In the beginning of 2005 Igor Lutsenko joined the group, as a replacement for Viktor Bondaryuk, who had previously left.

Discography 
The first album of Russkiy Razmer, Ю-А-Ю (Yu-A-Yu), was recorded with a female vocalist, Анжела (Anzhelika Kuznetsova), and Вадим Володин (Vadim Volodin), who was the sound-arranger and producer of that time.  The album had a successful debut in Russia. It was influenced by the rave movement and groups like 2 Unlimited. Nevertheless, it was different from the albums of the genre in the sense that it incorporated the "space traveling" concept and included melodic love songs connected with it.

The next album Ля-Ля-Фа (La-La-Fa) was recorded with Профессор Лебединский (Professor Lebedinsky) and consisted mainly of energetic and funny rave cover-versions of all-time popular Russian songs. It was later re-issued as Давай! Давай! (Come on! Come on!) and was even more of a success in Russia than the first album.

At the same time, the group was recording an alternative club album, Мяу (Meow), which was inspired by their active club life. It had the alternate title Съешь таблетку, будь здоров! (Eat a Pill and be Healthy!). Liner notes of the album mention that it was not about glamorizing drugs, such as ecstasy, but was instead just about a healthy way of life. The album consists of eleven techno-rave compositions. The first track from it, Человек собаке друг (A Human is a Dog's Friend), reached the 12th place on the Dutch club charts in 1996.

After a two-year hiatus the group released their fifth album in 1998, Танцуем? (We Dance?). The female voice on the album belongs to Eva Polna.

In 1999 the group released their album 650, which featured the female vocalist Настя (Nastya). The album got its title from 650 MB volume of a CD because it was supposed to have contained an enhanced CD-ROM feature. The enhanced version of the CD, however, was a very limited pressing, so it was decided to re-release the album under the title 650.2. On the re-released version some new songs were added, some were excluded, and the multimedia part consisted of the contents of their official web-site, including photos of the group, stories, videos and mp3s. While the songs from 650 are perhaps less romantic when compared to the songs from Танцуем? (We Dance?) they represent a synthesis of creative and professional skills in writing dance-pop songs.

Before the next studio album, a collection of dance cover-versions of popular songs (mostly songs from famous Soviet films), Next, was issued.

A year later, the album БумZ-БумZ (BumZ-BumZ) was the last in the group's most successful period. The title comes from the German slang word bumsen (i.e., to have sex), which is phonetically similar to the sound of a drum-machine. The twelve tracks of the album are mainly quality dance-pop songs with true-to-life texts, but among them are also some tracks without vocals. Almost all of them became radio hits and favorites of dance-pop parties. From this album onwards the group has collaborated with the female vocalist Элеонора (Eleonora Filimonova).

The group then released the albums Выход - OUT (Exit - OUT), Меня колбасит (I Feel Groovy), and Восходящие воздушные потоки (Ascending Airflows). The last album with Viktor Bondaryuk was Цyzамен (Together, in German zusammen). It consisted of the group's collected collaborative works, remixes and some new songs. The new album !Слушай (!Listen) was released in 2010. It consisted of new songs, club tracks and remixes, which were recorded for the last 5 years.

Literature
Alexander Alekseev, Andrei Burlaka (2001). Encyclopedia of Russian Pop and Rock Music. — Moscow: Eksmo-Press, p. 333.

References

External links
 Russki Razmer's official website (in Russian)
 Russki Razmer's unofficial forum (in Russian)
 Russkiy Razmer on russmus.net: lyrics and English translations

Eurodance groups
Musical groups from Saint Petersburg
Russian DJs
Russian pop music groups
Russian techno musicians
Russian synthpop groups
Techno music groups
Electronic dance music DJs